Berno was a medieval male name and could refer to:
 Bjørn (fl. 856–858), also known as Berno
 Berno of Cluny, also known as Berno of Baume (c. 850–925) - first abbot of Cluny and saint
 Berno of Reichenau (c. 978–1048) - German abbot, reformer of Gregorian chant
 Berno,  Apostle of the Obotrites, also known as Berno of Amelungsborn or Berno, Bishop of Schwerin (d. 1191) - German monk and bishop